Stuart Richard Bickel (born October 2, 1986) is an American former professional ice hockey defenseman. He played in the National Hockey League (NHL) with the New York Rangers and Minnesota Wild.

Playing career
On July 2, 2008, the Anaheim Ducks signed Bickel, an undrafted free agent, to a three-year contract. In the 2010–11 season, on November 23, 2010, Bickel was traded by the Ducks to the New York Rangers in exchange for fellow defenseman, Nigel Williams.  After starting the 2011–12 season with the AHL Connecticut Whale, Bickel was called up to the Rangers on December 18, 2011.  He made his NHL debut on December 20, 2011, in a game against the New Jersey Devils at the Prudential Center, recording an assist in the game for his first NHL point.

The Rangers re-signed Bickel to a two-year contract on July 1, 2012. He started the delayed 2012–13 season with the Rangers after the NHL lockout, but after 16 games he was placed on waivers and assigned to their AHL affiliate, the Whale and Wolf Pack for the remainder of his two-year contract.

On July 1, 2014, Bickel signed a one-year, two-way contract with the Minnesota Wild. Bickel was assigned initially to AHL affiliate, the Iowa Wild to begin the 2014–15 season, however, he made his return to the NHL for the first time since 2012, appearing in nine games with Minnesota with one assist.

As an unsigned free agent over the off-season, Bickel accepted an invitation to the St. Louis Blues training camp on a professional try-out. After he was unable to earn a contract with the Blues, and their AHL affiliate, the Chicago Wolves, Bickel signed a professional try-out with the San Diego Gulls on October 9, 2015.

Bickel, in his tenth and final professional season, made four appearances with the San Diego Gulls in the 2017–18 AHL season.

Coaching career
Having ended his professional career, for the 2018–19 season, Bickel accepted an assistant coaching role for the University of Minnesota hockey team. In 2020, Bickel left the U of M and became the head coach of the North American Hockey League's Minnesota Magicians, based out of Richfield, Minnesota, for the 2020–21 season. After one season with the Magicians, he initially joined the St. Thomas (Minnesota) Tommies men's ice hockey team as an assistant coach before joining the 2021–22 staff of the American Hockey League's Springfield Thunderbirds as an assistant coach.

Career statistics

References

External links

1986 births
American men's ice hockey defensemen
Bakersfield Condors (1998–2015) players
Connecticut Whale (AHL) players
Elmira Jackals (ECHL) players
Green Bay Gamblers players
Hartford Wolf Pack players
Ice hockey players from Minnesota
Iowa Stars players
Iowa Wild players
Living people
Minnesota Golden Gophers men's ice hockey players
Minnesota Wild players
New York Rangers players
People from Chanhassen, Minnesota
San Antonio Rampage players
San Diego Gulls (AHL) players
Sioux Falls Stampede players
Syracuse Crunch players
Undrafted National Hockey League players